Romainmôtier is a village and former municipality in the district of Orbe in the canton of Vaud, Switzerland.

In 1970 the municipality was merged with the neighboring municipality Envy to form a new and larger municipality Romainmôtier-Envy.

History
Its name was taken from the monastery that was founded by Saint Romain around AD 450.

References

Villages in the canton of Vaud
Former municipalities of the canton of Vaud